White Marsh Mall is a regional shopping mall in the unincorporated and planned community of White Marsh, Maryland. The mall is anchored by Macy's, Macy's Home Store, Boscov's, JCPenney and Dave & Buster's. White Marsh Mall is the fourth largest mall in the Baltimore area, behind Towson Town Center, Arundel Mills Mall and Annapolis Mall. It is adjacent to an IKEA store and The Avenue at White Marsh shopping center.

History
From 1972 to 1981, the planning and development of the White Marsh Mall occurred with The Rouse Company as owner and developer on land rented from Nottingham, the site developer. In July 1973, Sears committed as an anchor store. In 1981, most stores opened, with Bamberger's, JCPenney, Woodward & Lothrop, Hutzler's, and Sears as the original anchors. In 1986, Bamberger's became Macy's. In 1992, Hecht's replaced the defunct Hutzler's. In 1998, Lord & Taylor replaced the defunct Woodward & Lothrop. In 2004, Lord & Taylor repositioned and shuttered entirely. It converted to a Hecht's Home Store. In 2006, the original Macy's closed and was replaced by Boscov's, while the Hecht's and Hecht's Home Store were converted to Macy's and Macy's Home, respectively. In December 2017, Dave & Buster's joined the center.
On February 6, 2020, it was announced that Sears will close.

Current tenants
JCPenney (since 1981)
Macy's (Second Building since 2006)
Macy's Home Store (since 2006)
Boscov's (opened 2006-2008 reopened  since 2012)
Dave & Buster's (since 2017)

Former tenants
Bamberger's (1981-1986)
Hutzler's (1981-1990)
Woodward & Lothrop (1981-1995)
Sears (1981-2020)
Macy's (First Building 1986-2006)
Hecht's (1992-2006)
Lord & Taylor (1998-2004)
Hecht's Home Store (2004-2006)
Sports Authority (2004-2016)
Boscov's (Abandoned 2008-2012)

References

External links
 Official Site
 Inside picture of White Marsh Mall during construction

Brookfield Properties
Shopping malls in Maryland
Baltimore County, Maryland landmarks
Shopping malls established in 1981
Tourist attractions in Baltimore County, Maryland
White Marsh, Maryland
1981 establishments in Maryland